Idukki has an area of 4,358 km² and is the second-largest District of Kerala. Rugged mountains and forests cover about 97 percent of the total area of the District. The district borders the Kerala districts of Pathanamthitta to the south, Kottayam to the southeast, Ernakulam to the northeast and Thrissur  to the north and Coimbature, Dindigul and Theni District s in Tamil Nadu to the east. 

The District headquarters -Civil Station is situated at Kuyilimala, Painavu. Kuyilimala literally translates to the Cuckoo ('Kuyil')hills ('mala').

References

Villages in Idukki district